Qom International Airport is an under construction international airport located  southwest of the city of Qom in Iran.

In August 2014, Chinese investors from Gansu showed an interest in financing the construction of the international airport.

See also
 List of airports in Iran

References

External links

Airports in Iran
Transportation in Qom Province
Buildings and structures in Qom Province